David Sidney Peach (born 21 January 1951) is an English former professional footballer who played as a full-back. He notably appeared for Southampton in the FA Cup Final 1976.

Playing career

Chelsea and Gillingham
Peach played briefly as an associate schoolboy for Chelsea, before moving to Gillingham as an apprentice in May 1966, turning pro in February 1969. He also played minor counties cricket for Huntingdonshire. In 1972, he was sent off in successive seasons in matches at Hartlepool United, a coincidence in an era when sendings-off were still very uncommon. Peach was named in the 1973–74 Fourth Division PFA Team of the Year. He was rated the best player in the Fourth Division and came to the attention of Lawrie McMenemy who made him his first signing for Southampton in January 1974, for a reported fee of £50,000.

Southampton
He made his debut in a match that is memorable to Saints fans for all the wrong reasons as Southampton lost 7–0 away to Ipswich. Peach soon settled into the team initially in midfield before becoming an imaginative, quick thinking attacking left-back and the club's regular penalty taker. His first penalty was probably the most famous, as he scored the second goal against Crystal Palace in the FA Cup semi-final on 3 April 1976. Peach played in the final against Manchester United as Southampton won 1–0. He was named in the 1976–77 Second Division PFA Team of the Year.

Peach also played in the 1979 League Cup final, scoring the opening goal in a 3–2 loss to Nottingham Forest. He and Nick Holmes are the only two players to have played in two Cup Finals for Southampton.

He played several times for the England under-21 and 'B' teams, and was in the England squad on their tour of South America in June 1977, although he never played.

On 18 August 1979, he became the highest scoring full-back in the history of the Football League when he scored a penalty against Manchester United.

Swindon and Orient
He was transferred to Swindon Town for £150,000 (then Swindon's record signing) in March 1980. Signed by Bobby Smith to replace Town legend John Trollope, circumstances were against Peach from the very moment he joined the club; his time at Swindon had the worst possible start - his debut coming in 6–2 defeat at Millwall. That defeat, along with the size of the transfer fee, got Peach off to a terrible start with the fans - and he was never a popular player throughout his whole Town career.

By March 1982, Swindon were in financial difficulties and Peach was released to Orient on a free transfer to reduce the club's wage bill, after a disappointing period at the County Ground.

In moving to Orient, he swapped a team heading for relegation to Division 4 for one heading for relegation from Division 2. While at Orient, he became the first player to have played on every Football League ground.

After football

After retiring from league football, Peach turned out for several Hampshire non-league clubs, including a spell as player-manager at Wellworthy Athletic in Lymington and Lymington Town. Nowadays, he lives in the New Forest where he runs his own building business.

Honours

As a player
Southampton
 FA Cup winners: 1976
 League Cup runners-up: 1979
Individual

 PFA Division Four Team of the Year: 1973–74
 PFA Division Two Team of the Year: 1976–77
 Southampton Player of the Season: 1975–76

References

Bibliography 

1951 births
Living people
People from Milford on Sea
English footballers
Association football defenders
England B international footballers
England under-21 international footballers
FA Cup Final players
English Football League players
Southampton F.C. players
Gillingham F.C. players
Swindon Town F.C. players
Leyton Orient F.C. players
Andover F.C. players
English football managers
Wellworthy Athletic F.C. managers
Lymington Town F.C. managers